Striker or The Strikers may refer to:

People
A participant in a strike action
A participant in a hunger strike
Blacksmith's striker, a type of blacksmith's assistant
Striker's Independent Society, the oldest mystic krewe in America

People with surname Striker 
 Eric Striker (born c. early 1990s), American football linebacker for the Oklahoma Sooners
 Fran Striker (1903–1962), American writer for radio and comics
 Gisela Striker (born 1943), professor of Philosophy and Classics at Harvard University
 Jake Striker (1933–2013), former left-handed pitcher in Major League Baseball
 Joseph Striker (1898–1974), American actor
 Matt Striker (born 1974), WWE wrestler
 "Mighty Striker", Trinidadian calypsonian Percival Oblington (1930–2011), also known simply as 'Striker'
 Striker (gamer), handle of Overwatch player Kwon Nam-joo

Entertainment and fiction 
 Striker (2010 film), a 2010 Hindi film
 Striker (1987 film), a 1987 Italian war-action film
 Striker (comic), a comic strip in the British tabloid The Sun
 Striker (Marvel Comics), a Marvel Comics character
 Ted Striker, a character in the films Airplane! and Airplane II: The Sequel
 The Striker, a 2013 novel in the Isaac Bell series, by Clive Cussler and Justin Scott

Sports
Striker (association football), a position in association football
Striker (field hockey), a position in field hockey
 Striker (FIFA World Cup mascot) (1994)
 Four different American soccer teams were called the Fort Lauderdale Strikers:
 The current Fort Lauderdale Strikers (2011) who play in the North American Soccer League
 Fort Lauderdale Strikers (1977–83) played in the NASL from 1977 to 1983
 The Minnesota Strikers played in the NASL and MISL from 1984 to 1988 and were a continuation of the original Fort Lauderdale Strikers
 Fort Lauderdale Strikers (1988–94) played in the ASL and APSL from 1988 to 1994
 Florida Strikers played in the USISL from 1994 to 1997
Richmond Strikers, an unrelated soccer club in Richmond, Virginia
 The active batsman in cricket
 Striker, a term used in mixed martial arts to refer to a fighter that is especially skilled in stand-up fighting
 PCB Strikers, a Pakistani women's cricket team

Weapons 
 FV102 Striker, a British Army anti-tank guided missile carrier
 Armsel Striker, a revolver action shotgun
 A form of firing pin, part of the firing mechanism of a firearm
 The Mk 47 Striker, an automatic grenade launcher

Military 
 Camp Striker, a logistical and life support bases on Victory Base Complex, Iraq 
 HMS Striker, the name of three ships of the Royal Navy
 A helmet-mounted display, in service on the Eurofighter Typhoon
 A member of the US Navy working toward a specific rating; see List of United States Navy enlisted rates

Gaming
 Strikers, initial North American release name for the Spriggan manga series
 Strikers, another name for Spriggans characters in the Spriggan manga series
 Striker (video game), a 1992 football video game for numerous systems
 Striker (miniatures game), a 1981 wargame in the Traveller Universe
 Striker, a type of character in the King of Fighters video game series
 Mario Strikers, a series of soccer video games published by Nintendo with Mario franchise characters
 Striker, a sub-class of the Titan character class in the Destiny franchise

Other 
 Oshkosh Striker, a make of fire truck
 Dolphin striker, a spar aboard a sailing ship
 Raw Striker, a kit car manufacturer
 Sylva Striker, a Sylva Autokits car model later acquired by Raw Striker
 Fire striker, a piece of iron or steel used to generate sparks by striking it against a hard material such as flint

Music
 The Strikers (funk band)
 The Strikers (psychobilly band)
 Striker (band)

See also 
 Stryker (disambiguation)
 Strike (disambiguation)
 Straker, a surname